Emily "Eve" Best (born 31 July 1971) is an English actress and director. She is known for her television roles as Dr. Eleanor O'Hara in the Showtime series Nurse Jackie (2009–13), First Lady Dolley Madison in the American Experience television special (2011), and Monica Chatwin in the BBC miniseries The Honourable Woman (2014). She also played Wallis Simpson in the 2010 film The King's Speech.

Best won the 2006 Olivier Award for Best Actress for playing the title role in Hedda Gabler. She made her Broadway debut in the 2007 revival of A Moon for the Misbegotten, winning the Drama Desk Award for Outstanding Actress in a Play, and receiving the first of two nominations for the Tony Award for Best Actress in a Play; the second was for the revival of The Homecoming in 2008. She returned to Broadway in the 2015 revival of Old Times. She was cast as Princess Rhaenys Targaryen in HBO’s House of the Dragon.

Early life and education
Best grew up in Ladbroke Grove, London, the daughter of a design journalist and an actress. Her early performances were with the W11 Opera children's opera company in London at the age of nine. She attended Wycombe Abbey Girls' School before going on to Lincoln College, Oxford, where she studied English. After graduating from Oxford where she had appeared in Oxford University Dramatic Society productions and performed at the Edinburgh Festival, she made her professional debut as Beatrice in Much Ado About Nothing at the Southwark Playhouse.

Career
After working on the London fringe, Best trained at the Royal Academy of Dramatic Art (RADA) in London. After graduating in 1999 she appeared in a revival of 'Tis Pity She's a Whore at the Young Vic for which she won both the Evening Standard and Critics' Circle best newcomer awards; she adopted her grandmother's name as a stage name, as an Emily Best was already registered with British Actors' Equity Association.

Best won a Laurence Olivier Award for playing the title role in Hedda Gabler and was nominated for the same award the following year for her performance as Josie in Eugene O'Neill's play A Moon for the Misbegotten at the Old Vic Theatre in London.

In early 2007, she starred in a Sheffield Crucible production of As You Like It which played for a short time at the RSC's Swan Theatre in Stratford as part of their Complete Works season. In the same year she performed in the Broadway transfer of A Moon for the Misbegotten for which she was nominated for a Tony Award as Best Actress in a Play.

Best appeared in Harold Pinter's The Homecoming at the Cort Theatre in New York, which co-starred Ian McShane, Raúl Esparza and Michael McKean. Daniel Sullivan directed the 20-week limited engagement, which ran until 13 April 2008. She once again appeared as Beatrice in a critically acclaimed production of Much Ado About Nothing at Shakespeare's Globe Theatre in 2011, playing opposite Charles Edwards as Benedick and starred in the Old Vic production of The Duchess of Malfi in 2012. She made her directorial debut with a production of Macbeth at Shakespeare's Globe Theatre in 2013.

Television appearances include Prime Suspect: The Final Act (2006), Waking the Dead (2004), Shackleton (2002), and The Inspector Lynley Mysteries (2005).

She appeared as Lucrece in the Naxos audiobook version of Shakespeare's The Rape of Lucrece. She also starred in a 2000 BBC Radio 4 production of Emma.

Best co-starred as Dr. Eleanor O'Hara in the Showtime dark comedy series Nurse Jackie, that premiered in June 2009. She played the Duchess of Windsor – Wallis Simpson – in The King's Speech, starring Colin Firth and Geoffrey Rush.

Best also co-starred as Sally Ride, the first American woman in space, alongside William Hurt in The Challenger Disaster, a British made for TV dramatization of the Rogers Commission set up to investigate the 1986 Space Shuttle Challenger disaster.

In summer 2014 Best played Cleopatra, the leading role in the Shakespeare's Globe version of Antony and Cleopatra. She returned to Broadway in the 2015 revival of the Pinter play Old Times, opposite Clive Owen and Kelly Reilly. She played headmistress Farah Dowling in Fate: The Winx Saga.

Filmography

Film

Television

Stage

Awards and nominations

References

External links

Interview with the Sunday Times
W11 Opera

Actresses from London
Alumni of Lincoln College, Oxford
Alumni of RADA
Critics' Circle Theatre Award winners
Drama Desk Award winners
English stage actresses
English television actresses
English radio actresses
Laurence Olivier Award winners
Living people
English Shakespearean actresses
People educated at Wycombe Abbey
1971 births
Theatre World Award winners